is an athletic stadium in Saku, Nagano Prefecture, Japan. It is one of the home stadiums of football club AC Nagano Parceiro Ladies.

It was one of the home stadiums of football club AC Nagano Parceiro in 2014.

References

External links
Official site

Sports venues in Nagano Prefecture
Football venues in Japan
AC Nagano Parceiro
Sports venues completed in 2013
Saku, Nagano
2013 establishments in Japan